Klaartje Liebens (born 11 January 1995) is a Belgian retired tennis player.

Liebens won five singles titles on the ITF Circuit in her career. On 16 February 2015, she attained her best singles ranking of world No. 295. On 20 May 2013, she peaked at No. 743 in the doubles rankings.

She made her WTA Tour main-draw debut at the 2015 Diamond Games, defeating Barbora Krejčíková, Gioia Barbieri and Ysaline Bonaventure in the qualifying tournament.

Liebens announced her retirement from the professional tour in July 2017.

ITF finals

Singles: 13 (5–8)

Doubles: 1 (0–1)

References

External links
 
 

1995 births
Living people
Sportspeople from Brussels
Belgian female tennis players
Flemish sportspeople
21st-century Belgian women